Chris Critelli (born 5 December 1956) is a Canadian basketball player. She competed in the women's tournament at the 1976 Summer Olympics.

Awards and honors
Top 100 U Sports women's basketball Players of the Century (1920-2020).

References

1956 births
Living people
Basketball people from Ontario
Canadian women's basketball players
Olympic basketball players of Canada
Basketball players at the 1976 Summer Olympics
Sportspeople from St. Catharines